The 1997 CCHA Men's Ice Hockey Tournament was the 26th CCHA Men's Ice Hockey Tournament. It was played between March 7 and March 15, 1997. Opening round games were played at campus sites, while all 'final four' games were played at Joe Louis Arena in Detroit, Michigan. By winning the tournament, Michigan received the Central Collegiate Hockey Association's automatic bid to the 1997 NCAA Division I Men's Ice Hockey Tournament.

Format
The tournament featured three rounds of play. The two teams that finish below eighth place in the standings were not eligible for postseason play. In the quarterfinals, the first and eighth seeds, the second and seventh seeds, the third seed and sixth seeds and the fourth seed and fifth seeds played a best-of-three series, with the winners advancing to the semifinals. In the semifinals, the remaining highest and lowest seeds and second highest and second lowest seeds play a single-game, with the winners advancing to the finals. The tournament champion receives an automatic bid to the 1997 NCAA Division I Men's Ice Hockey Tournament.

Conference standings
Note: GP = Games played; W = Wins; L = Losses; T = Ties; PTS = Points; GF = Goals For; GA = Goals Against

Bracket

Note: * denotes overtime period(s)

Quarterfinals

(1) Michigan vs. (8) Alaska–Fairbanks

(2) Miami vs. (7) Ohio State

(3) Michigan State vs. (6) Western Michigan

(4) Lake Superior State vs. (5) Bowling Green

Semifinals

(1) Michigan vs. (5) Bowling Green

(2) Miami vs. (3) Michigan State

Championship

(1) Michigan vs. (3) Michigan State

Tournament awards

All-Tournament Team
F Mike Watt (Michigan State)
F Jason Botterill (Michigan)
F Brendan Morrison* (Michigan)
D Mike Weaver (Michigan State)
D Chris Bogas (Michigan State)
G Chad Alban (Michigan State)
* Most Valuable Player(s)

References

External links
CCHA Champions
1996–97 CCHA Standings
1996–97 NCAA Standings

CCHA Men's Ice Hockey Tournament
Ccha tournament